ABC Sports Award of the Year was one of the premier sports awards in Australia. From 1951 to 1983, it was called the ABC Sportsman of the Year Award.

The award was originally voted for by Australian Broadcasting Corporation sports supervisors and the sports editors of major Australian newspapers. After 1983, members of the Australian Sportswriters' Association also voted. The awards were first presented on television in 1957.

Swimmer Dawn Fraser was voted as the best Australian sportsman of the 25 years in 1975 as part of the award silver jubilee celebrations.

In 1993, there was a merger of the Sport Australia Awards and the ABC Sports Award of the Year with the new award known as ABC Sport Australia Awards. After 1994, the new award removed the ABC from its title. The award was later known as the Australian Sport Awards and ceased in 2006. The main national annual awards are Sport Australia Hall of Fame Awards and the Australian Institute of Sport Awards.

Individual award winners

Most Outstanding Team Award Winners
Team award was introduced in 1987.

See also
 Sport in Australia
Sport Australia Hall of Fame inductees
 Australian Sport Awards
 Australian Institute of Sport Awards
 World Trophy for Australasia

References

Australian sports trophies and awards
History of sport in Australia
Awards established in 1951
Australia
Australian Broadcasting Corporation